Nikolay Voronkov (born 1883, date of death unknown) was a Russian Empire swimmer. He competed in the men's 400 metre freestyle event at the 1912 Summer Olympics.

References

1883 births
Year of death missing
Male swimmers from the Russian Empire
Olympic competitors for the Russian Empire
Swimmers at the 1912 Summer Olympics
Sportspeople from Vilnius